Alexander was a prominent Rhodian who lived in the 1st century BC.  In the war against Gaius Cassius Longinus he was at the head of the popular party, and was raised to the office of prytaneis, in 43.  Soon after, he and the Rhodian admiral, Mnaseas, were defeated by Cassius in a naval battle off Knidos.

References

1st-century BC Rhodians
Ancient Rhodian generals
Roman-era Rhodians